Daya Mata (Sanskrit for Compassionate Mother), born Rachel Faye Wright, (January 31, 1914November 30, 2010) was the third president and sanghamata (mother of the society) of the only organization that Paramahansa Yogananda created to disseminate his teachings, Self-Realization Fellowship (SRF) in Los Angeles, California/ Yogoda Satsanga Society of India (YSS), for over 55 years.

Early life
She was born in Salt Lake City, Utah, to a family affiliated with the Church of Jesus Christ of Latter-day Saints (LDS Church). Her ancestors were among the original Mormon pioneers to the Salt Lake Valley.  Her grandfather, Abraham Reister Wright, was an architect of the LDS Church's Salt Lake Tabernacle. She has been listed as a "Famous Utahn" by the Utah Office of Tourism.

Discipleship
Daya Mata first met Yogananda in 1931 at the age of 17 years, while seeking one thing: perfect, unconditional love. She found it in Yogananda, Premavatar (divine incarnation of love), and joined Yogananda's ashram that year. In time, she took her monastic vows with Yogananda and was given the name Daya. She describes her steadfast yearning:

She became one of Yogananda's first monastic disciples after entering his Self-Realization Fellowship ashram atop Mt. Washington in Los Angeles, on November 19, 1931. Yogananda wrote to Daya Mata on her birthday in 1946:

As the president and sanghamata (spiritual head) of SRF/YSS from 1955 until her death in 2010, she devoted herself single-mindedly to fulfilling these words of her guru.

After Yogananda's death, and the death of his successor Rajarsi Janakananda, she became the third president of YSS/SRF in 1955. "Through her many years of discipleship as one of the closest personal assistants to Paramahansa Yogananda, and with the caring discipline of the Guru, Daya Mata came to embody the spiritual depth and universal love required of the one who was chosen by Paramahansaji to lead his spiritual and humanitarian work. India’s former ambassador to the United States, Dr. Binay R. Sen, has observed:

Some of Daya Mata's family members became members of SRF. Her brother, Richard Wright, served as Yogananda's personal secretary for many years, accompanying Yogananda on his trip to India on June 9, 1935, and appearing in his Autobiography of a Yogi. Her mother was also an SRF member. Daya Mata and her sister Ananda Mata (Virginia Wright) served on the SRF Board of Directors.

Daya Mata was one of the first women to lead a worldwide religious organization and monastic order. In Today's Women in World Religions by Arvind Sharma, Linda Johnsen was quoted as saying that the new wave today is women, because major Indian gurus have passed on their spiritual mantle to women, including Yogananda to the American-born Daya Mata. At the time of her death, she had been president of Self-Realization Fellowship/Yogoda Satsanga Society of India since 1955. Before her death, she had been living in seclusion "at one of the fellowship's nuns' retreats in Los Angeles." She died on the evening of November 30, 2010, in Los Angeles.

Works
Daya Mata authored three volumes:

 Enter the Quiet Heart: Creating a Loving Relationship with God.
 Finding the Joy Within You: Personal Counsel for God Centered Living,
 Only Love: Living the Spiritual Life in a Changing World,

See also
Kriya Yoga
Lahiri Mahasaya
Mahavatar Babaji
Swami Sri Yukteswar Giri

References

External links
 Sri Daya Mata in Memoriam
 About Sri Anandamayi Ma, an Indian Saint, by Sri Daya Mata click here  
 

Writers from Los Angeles
Writers from Salt Lake City
Devotees of Paramahansa Yogananda
Former Latter Day Saints
1914 births
2010 deaths
American yogis
Kriya yogis
Women yogis
American spiritual writers
American women writers
Burials at Forest Lawn Memorial Park (Glendale)
Women mystics